Daniel Lönn (born 18 August 2001) is a Swedish politician of the Sweden Democrats party who has been a Member of the Riksdag since 2023. He represents the Dalarna County constituency. 

Lönn was born in Borlänge. He worked for one year as a school teacher before becoming a local authority worker and later a parliamentary assistant to SD representative Mats Nordberg. He is chairman of the Young Swedes SDU in Dalarna and is a member of the regional council of Borlänge. In 2023, Lönn was appointed to the Riksdag following the death of Mats Nordberg. However, he was allocated to take Sara Gille's seat due to the latter being on maternity leave while Rasmus Giertz would take Nordberg's seat.

At twenty one, he is the youngest politician ever to serve in the Riksdag at the time of his appointment.

See also 
 List of members of the Riksdag, 2022–2026
 Baby of the house

References 

Living people
2001 births
Members of the Riksdag from the Sweden Democrats
21st-century Swedish politicians
Members of the Riksdag 2022–2026